Sphaerotheca rolandae (common names: Sri Lanka bullfrog, Roland's burrowing frog, southern burrowing frog, marble sand frog) is a species of frog in the family Dicroglossidae found in Sri Lanka. It is controversial whether the species also occurs in India and Nepal. Its natural habitats are subtropical or tropical dry forest, subtropical or tropical dry shrubland, intermittent freshwater marshes, arable land, and pastureland.
It is threatened by habitat loss.

References

rolandae
Frogs of Sri Lanka
Endemic fauna of Sri Lanka
Taxonomy articles created by Polbot
Amphibians described in 1983